Mar Gregorios Orthodox Church, Janakpuri is a parish church under the Delhi Diocese of the Indian Orthodox Church. The parish was formed in 1975 for the members of the church residing in West Delhi.  The church is the first parish in Diocese of Delhi established in the name of St. Gregorios. Paulos Mar Gregorios, the first Metropolitan of Delhi Diocese,  took the initiative in forming the Parish.

The nearest Orthodox Church is St.George's Orthodox Church, Dwaraka.

References

External links
 Website of the church

Christian organizations established in 1975
Oriental Orthodox congregations established in the 20th century
Malankara Orthodox Syrian church buildings